Joseph Anthony Sirola (October 7, 1929 – February 10, 2019) was an American commercial, film, television, theatre actor and theatre producer.

Life and career 
Sirola was born in Carteret, New Jersey to Croatian parents Anton, a carpenter and Ana (née Dubrovich), who ran a boardinghouse at 363 West 19th Street in Chelsea. He graduated from Stuyvesant High School in 1947 and earned a Bachelor of Science in Business from Columbia University in 1951. He then worked as a sales promotion manager at the multinational personal care corporation Kimberly-Clark, at the age of 28.

Sirola began his acting career in 1959, appearing as Peter Nino in the television soap opera The Brighter Day. In 1960 he co-starred in a Broadway play, The Unsinkable Molly Brown, Sirola co-starred in another Broadway play, Golden Rainbow, in 1968. During the 1960s he also appeared in a few films and television programs including Gunsmoke, Hang 'Em High, The Andy Griffith Show, Chuka, Get Smart, The Man from U.N.C.L.E., Perry Mason, Strange Bedfellows and The Greatest Story Ever Told. His work on television commercials, for which he would win over 20 Clio Awards, led to The Wall Street Journal nicknaming him “The King of the Voice-Overs” in 1970.

Over the next 30 years Sirola appeared and guest-starred in numerous film and television programs including Hawaii Five-O, The Super Cops, Mannix, Kolchak: The Night Stalker, Wonder Woman, Quincy, M.E., Seizure, The Rockford Files, Spin City, Love, American Style, Charlie's Angels, Terrible Joe Moran, Diagnosis: Murder, The Ellen Burstyn Show and Washington: Behind Closed Doors. He also starred in two short-lived television programs, The Montefuscos and Wolf. Sirola continued in voice-over work for television commercials including ads for Ford, Mobil, Wendy's and Nyquil.

In the 21st century Sirola began producing Broadway plays, including, Time Stands Still, Stick Fly, The Trip to Bountiful, A Gentleman's Guide to Love & Murder and Love Letters. He also won and was nominated for Drama Desk Awards and Tony Awards. Sirola retired in 2015.

Death 
Sirola died in February 2019 of complications from respiratory failure at the hospital in New York, at the age of 89.

Filmography

References

External links 

Rotten Tomatoes profile

1929 births
2019 deaths
People from Carteret, New Jersey
Stuyvesant High School alumni
Columbia College (New York) alumni
Male actors from New Jersey
Deaths from respiratory failure
American people of Croatian descent
American male film actors
American male stage actors
American male television actors
20th-century American male actors
21st-century American male actors
American theatre people